Deen may refer to:

People
 Deen (singer), singer from Bosnia and Herzegovina
 Deen Castronovo, American musician
 James Deen, American pornographic actor
 Paula Deen, American chef and TV personality

Other uses
 Dīn (also Deen), an Arabic word and Qur'anic term (دين) meaning "religion".
 Deen (band), a Japanese band
 Deen (album)
 Studio Deen, a Japanese animation studio
 River Deen (Dinin, Dinan), Ireland

See also
Dean (disambiguation)
Deane (disambiguation)